West Division is a townland of 6,739 acres in County Antrim, Northern Ireland. It is situated in the civil parish of Carrickfergus and the historic barony of Carrickfergus.

See also 
List of townlands in County Antrim
List of places in County Antrim

References

Townlands of County Antrim
Barony of Carrickfergus